The Yankee Stadium Legacy set is a 6,752-card compilation chronicling every single game the New York Yankees ever played at the original Yankee Stadium since April 18, 1923. The card set was manufactured by Upper Deck and made its official debut by being randomly inserted into packs of Upper Deck’s 2008 Series 1 Baseball. 

As part of a promotion related to the set, the first five collectors who completed the set of all 6,661 cards inserted into 2008 Upper Deck Baseball products, were to travel to New York during the 2009 New York Yankees season to attend a game at the new Yankee Stadium and meet Yankee Captain, Derek Jeter. The Yankee Stadium Legacy cards representing the 2008 New York Yankees season appeared in 2009 Upper Deck Series One Baseball packs in February 2009 and put an end to the Yankee Stadium Legacy promotion. The five contest winners would receive the 82 cards representing the final season at Yankee Stadium.

Tommy Baxter, a 36-year-old from Little Rock, Arkansas, was the first collector to put together Upper Deck’s Yankee Stadium Legacy (YSL) Collection. Baxter was a Cubs fan. Baxter's accomplishment was commemorated with a card in 2009 Upper Deck Series One Baseball.

Notable events 
Some of the cards in the set commemorate some of the most famous sporting events that have taken place at Yankee Stadium. Some of these events include:  

Notes

Guinness Record
According to a January 2008 Upper Deck press release, Guinness World Records would certify Yankee Stadium Legacy as the largest baseball card set ever produced, once all the cards are released. 

However, the 1998 Topps TEK set contained 90 different player cards, that were each available in 90 different variations, for a total of 8,100 different cards which some collectors consider to be an even larger complete set.

Distribution 
The various sets where the Yankee Stadium Legacy cards were inserted into were: Spectrum; Piece of History; SPx; Upper Deck Series Two; SP Legendary Cuts (Hobby-only); SP Authentic; UDx; and UD Masterpieces. Upper Deck started the website www.OwnTheLegacy.com so that collectors could find out more about the Yankee Stadium Legacy set. Alphanumeric codes found on the backs of Yankee Stadium Legacy cards can be entered at the site, and collectors will can use the site to manage their collections online, and track their collections against other collectors via a leader board.

The cards commemorating the 2008 New York Yankees season were featured in Series 1 of 2009 Upper Deck baseball. Two of the more notable cards include YSL-AG (commemorating the 2008 Major League Baseball All-Star Game) and card YSL-6742 featuring Andy Pettite commemorating the final game at Yankee Stadium).

References

External links
 Yankee Stadium Legacy Checklist on Trading Card Database

New York Yankees
Baseball cards
Trading cards
2008 in baseball
Yankee Stadium (1923)